Toy Town Hall is a 1936 Warner Bros. Merrie Melodies cartoon directed by Friz Freleng. The short was released on September 19, 1936.

Plot
A young tot is put to bed in the middle of listening to the Ben Bernie Orchestra on the radio. He falls asleep and dreams that his toys in the room become movie and radio stars who put on a version of Fred Allen's Town Hall Tonight, with a bunch of musical acts. At the end of the short, the youngster wakes up.

Home media
LaserDisc - The Golden Age of Looney Tunes, Volume 5, Side 4 (1995 American Turner print)
DVD - Shall We Dance (1995 American Turner print added as a bonus)

References

Sources
 Internet Movie Database article 
 Big Cartoon Database article 

Merrie Melodies short films
1936 films
Short films directed by Friz Freleng
Films scored by Carl Stalling
1936 animated films
1930s Warner Bros. animated short films
Films about dreams
Films about sentient toys